Cineville is an American production and international distribution company founded in 1990 by Carl Colpaert and Christoph Henkel. Cineville has produced over 55 feature films which have participated in many major film festivals. 

Gas Food Lodging premiered at the Sundance Film Festival, nominated for the Golden Bear at the Berlinale and won the Independent Spirit Award for best actress. 
Mi Vida Loca premiered at the Cannes Film Festival. 
Hurlyburly (film) premiered at the Venice Film Festival with Sean Penn winning best actor. 
Mrs. Palfrey at the Claremont won the audience award at the Palm Springs Film Festival. 

Cineville.com, Inc is developing an American over-the-top content platform and production company headquartered in Santa Monica, California.

Cineville is trademarked in the US, EU and throughout Latin America.

Selected filmography

Delusion- Columbia Tristar
Gas Food Lodging (1992) - Columbia Tristar
Mi Vida Loca (1993) - Sony Classics
The Crew (film) (1994) - Lionsgate
Swimming with Sharks (1994) - Lionsgate
Cafe Society (film) (1995) - Showtime
The Whole Wide World (1996) - Sony Classics
 Nevada  - Columbia TristarThe Velocity of Gary (1997) - Columbia TristarHurlyburly (film) (1997) - New Line CinemaWhere Eskimos Live (2000) - CinevilleMrs. Palfrey at the Claremont (2006) - Cineville/ BBCG.I. Jesus (2006) - CinevilleBlack Limousine (film) (2010) - Starz Disconnected (2016 film) (2016) - Warner Bros.Female Fight Club (2017) - LionsgateAfterward (film) (2020) - LionsgatePaul Is Dead (film) (2021) - Universal UKYucatan (film)'' (2021) - Lionsgate

References

https://variety.com/2018/film/news/dito-montiel-director-afterward-1202966677/#!

https://variety.com/2015/film/news/afm-michael-jai-white-cops-and-robbers-1201632513/

https://www.screendaily.com/news/angel-oak-films-introduce-tiff-buyers-to-aaron-eckhart-thriller-afterward-exclusive/5142701.article

https://variety.com/1993/film/news/cineville-veep-slot-to-ireland-116288/

https://variety.com/1993/scene/people-news/moss-evers-join-cineville-as-veeps-102862/#!

http://thebusinessoffilmdaily.com/Bumpereditionafm2015/D3_S2.html

https://filmfestivaltoday.com/fft-festival-coverage/american-indies-compete-in-montreal

https://variety.com/1993/film/news/friendly-named-cineville-int-l-head-104520/

https://www.cinematographe.it/news/afterward-dito-montiel-film/

https://www.btrtoday.com/read/featured/119-featured-article/

https://www.prweb.com/releases/2004/07/prweb139860.htm

External links
Cineville homepage

Film production companies of the United States
1990 establishments in the United States